Marc Almert (1991, Cologne) is a German sommelier and 2019 World's Best Sommelier.

Biography 
Almert was born in Cologne in 1991. He passed the Advanced Sommelier Exam by the Court of Master Sommeliers in 2016. He was ASI World's Best Sommelier in 2019. He is currently head of wine department at two-Michelin-star restaurant Pavillon in Zurich. Almert tastes wine for Decanter.

Awards 
 2016, International Gaggenau Sommelier Awards
 2016, WOSA Sommelier Cup, Overall winner
 2017, Best Sommelier in Germany
 2019, ASI World's Best Sommelier

References 

Sommeliers
Living people
1991 births